Juana Borrero (May 18, 1877 – March 9, 1896) was a Cuban painter and poet.

Biography
Juana Borrero was born May 18, 1877. She was a native of the Santos Suárez neighborhood of Havana. She was the daughter of the writer and patriot Esteban Borrero Echevarría and of Consuelo Pierra.

Borrero began painting when she was five. She wrote her first poem at seven, and spoke multiple languages by the time she was ten. The poet Julian de Casal was a family friend and became her literary mentor. 

In 1887, she entered the San Alejandro Arts Academy; by 1891 her poems were being published in magazines around Cuba, including La Habana Elegante, one of the leading periodicals of the time.

She died of tuberculosis, in Key West, Florida, at the age of eighteen. She was buried in Key West, in a tomb belonging to friends of her family. Her gravesite was unidentified until a 1972 study by the Cuban Society of Archaeology and Ethnology in Exile. Her body was exhumed and transferred to her own tomb, with the inscription "Glory of Cuba" on her tombstone.

See also
 Cuban American literature
 List of Cuban-American writers

References

External links
 Juana Borrero at Cuba Literaria

1877 births
1896 deaths
Cuban poets
American writers of Cuban descent
Cuban women poets
People from Havana
19th-century deaths from tuberculosis
Cuban women painters
Cuban exiles
19th-century women artists
19th-century Cuban poets
19th-century Cuban painters
19th-century Cuban women writers
Tuberculosis deaths in Florida